The Lure of Heart's Desire is a 1916 silent American drama film directed by Francis J. Grandon. The film is considered to be lost.

Cast

 Edmund Breese as Jim Carew
 Arthur Hoops as Thomas Martin
 John Mahon as Crazy Jake
 Jeanette Horton as Ethel Wynndham
 Evelyn Brent as Little Snowbird

References

External links

1916 films
1916 drama films
Silent American drama films
American silent feature films
American black-and-white films
Films directed by Francis J. Grandon
Lost American films
Metro Pictures films
Films based on works by Robert W. Service
Films based on poems
1916 lost films
Lost drama films
1910s American films